Dentimargo pumila is a species of sea snail, a marine gastropod mollusk in the family Marginellidae, the margin snails.

Description
The size of the shell is 5 mm

Distribution
This species is distributed in the Indian Ocean along Madagascar, Mauritius and Réunion; in the Pacific Ocean along Hawaii

References

 Dautzenberg, Ph. (1929). Mollusques testacés marins de Madagascar. Faune des Colonies Francaises, Tome III
 Cossignani T. (2006). Marginellidae & Cystiscidae of the World. L'Informatore Piceno. 408pp

External links
 

Marginellidae
Gastropods described in 1870